Aechmea nidularioides is a plant species in the genus Aechmea. This species is native to Colombia, Ecuador, and Peru.

Cultivars
 Aechmea 'Caprice'
 Aechmea 'Salvador'

References

BSI Cultivar Registry Retrieved 11 October 2009
Tropicos Retrieved 25 September 2010

nidularioides
Flora of Colombia
Flora of Ecuador
Flora of Peru